Diekwisch is a German surname. Notable people with the surname include:

Erwin Diekwisch (1920–2013), German Luftwaffe pilot
Thomas Diekwisch (born 1961), German-born American scientist

German-language surnames